Vladyslav Zalevskyi (born 19 September 1998) is a Ukrainian handball player for ZTR Zaporizhia and the Ukrainian national team.

He represented Ukraine at the 2020 European Men's Handball Championship.

References

1998 births
Living people
Ukrainian male handball players
Sportspeople from Zaporizhzhia
ZTR players
21st-century Ukrainian people